Peter John Ryan (5 September 1891 – 8 April 1982) was an Australian rules footballer who played with St Kilda in the Victorian Football League (VFL).

Notes

External links 

 Peter John Ryan

1891 births
1982 deaths
Australian rules footballers from Victoria (Australia)
St Kilda Football Club players